Franki-Piaski is a village in the administrative district of Gmina Kobylin-Borzymy, within Wysokie Mazowieckie County, Podlaskie Voivodeship, in north-eastern Poland.

History
In 1827 the village comprised 10 houses and contained 48 inhabitants.

References

Franki-Piaski